Miller–Cansler House, also known as the Adam Miller Jr. House, is a historic home located near Maiden, Catawba County, North Carolina. It was built about 1820, and is a two-story, frame Federal style farmhouse.  It features a full-width shed-roofed porch.  A one-story frame ell was added in 1941.

It was listed on the National Register of Historic Places in 1990.

References

Houses on the National Register of Historic Places in North Carolina
Houses completed in 1820
Houses in Catawba County, North Carolina
National Register of Historic Places in Catawba County, North Carolina